Cyber Hunter is a 2019 Chinese sci-fi battle royale video game for mobiles and PC platforms developed and distributed by NetEase. It was released on 26 April 2019.

The mobile app of Cyber Hunter was banned in India (along with other Chinese apps) on 2 September 2020 by the government, the move came amid the 2020 China-India skirmish.

Release
The game was announced as Project:Battle by NetEase in May 2018 and initially released in October 2018 as beta test on Android and iOS mobile platforms and released globally on 26 April 2019.

Gameplay
The gameplay consists of traditional battle royale format with futuristic theme and some distinct elements such as players (referred in-game as Wanderers) are dropped on jet-fueled hoverboards which aid in landing early, fancy weapons such as microwave guns, weaponized vehicles, vertical climbing, parkour, gliding through the air using droids which are AI robots, building various structures for defense, detailed customization of characters, etc.

Reception
Josh Ye of AbacusNews.com criticizes Cyber Hunter for its lack of creativity and core innovation, calling it another PUBG Mobile clone. The game has borrowed many mechanics from several other games such as climbing, gliding and battlefield design from The Legend of Zelda: Breath of the Wild. Ash Mayhew of DroidGamers.com praises the game for genuine innovation in battle royale genre such as letting players create their own playing style. Though movement mechanics are borrowed from The Legend of Zelda: Breath of the Wild, there are many strategic options at players' disposal when stuck in a combat.

References

External links
 

2019 video games
Android (operating system) games
Battle royale games
IOS games
Video games developed in China
Video games scored by Keiichi Okabe
Windows games
NetEase games
Free-to-play video games
Internet censorship in India